Early general elections were held in Anguilla on 22 June 1981. The result was a victory for the Anguilla People's Party, which won five of the seven seats in the House of Assembly.

Results
Oneal Levons and Euton Smith were appointed as the nominated members.

References

Elections in Anguilla
Anguilla
General election
Anguillian general election
Election and referendum articles with incomplete results